Sibirsky Gigant is a rural locality (a settlement) in Nizhnesuyetsky Selsoviet, Suyetsky District, Altai Krai, Russia. The population was 144 as of 2013. There are 5 streets.

Geography 
Sibirsky Gigant is located 20 km southwest of Verkh-Suyetka (the district's administrative centre) by road. Nizhnyaya Suyetka is the nearest rural locality.

References 

Rural localities in Suyetsky District